During the 2000–01 English football season, Coventry City F.C. competed in the FA Premier League. It was their 34th consecutive season in the top division, but this season saw the club relegated and they have not been in the top flight since.

Season summary
Coventry City's season started promisingly. Despite an opening-day 3–1 home defeat to Middlesbrough, this was followed by back-to-back away victories at Southampton and Manchester City, which was the first time they had won an away league game since April 1999 and the first time they had won back-to-back away league games since February 1998. However, this burst of form instantly evaporated and by December 2000, Coventry had dropped into the relegation zone after obtaining only one more win (a 2–1 home win over Tottenham Hotspur) and 6 points from 13 matches. With the exception of three rounds, all of which were before January 2001, Coventry would ultimately stay there for the rest of the season. After 34 years in the top flight and 10 close shaves with relegation, their luck finally ran out and they were relegated to the First Division after a 3–2 away defeat at Aston Villa on 5 May 2001. It was the first time they had suffered relegation since 1958, when they were relegated to Division Four - then the fourth tier of English football. Much optimism followed Coventry's relegation with everyone at the club working hard to attain promotion at the first attempt. These hopes were boosted with the signing of prolific striker Lee Hughes from local rivals West Bromwich Albion.

In the FA Cup, Coventry won 2–0 away at Swindon Town in the third round, but were eliminated by Manchester City after a 1–0 defeat at Maine Road. Their League Cup campaign began with the club convincingly beating Preston North End 7–2 on aggregate in the second round (in which they won both legs), before defeating Southampton away for the second time in the season. However, this cup run came to an end after a 2–1 defeat by Ipswich Town at Portman Road.

Final league table

Results summary

Results by round

Results
Coventry City's score comes first

Legend

FA Premier League

FA Cup

League Cup

Players

First-team squad
Squad at end of season

Left club during season

Reserve squad
The following players were contracted to Coventry, but did not appear for the first team this season.

Statistics

Transfers

In

Out

Transfers in:  £12,800,000
Transfers out:  £16,750,000
Total spending:  £3,950,000

Loan in
 Alan Miller - Blackburn Rovers, 20 October, 37 days

Loan out
 Colin Hendry - Bolton Wanderers
 Robert Betts - Plymouth Argyle, 16 February, 19 days

References

Notes

Coventry City F.C. seasons
Coventry City